The FIA WTCR Race of Morocco (سباق المغرب) is a round of the World Touring Car Championship, held on the temporary Marrakech Street Circuit in the city of Marrakech in Morocco.

The race was first run in May 2009 on a purpose-built track. It was the first international car race in Morocco since the 1958 Moroccan Grand Prix at the Ain-Diab Circuit in Casablanca. It is also the only WTCC race to ever take place in Africa. The race was scheduled to be the season opener for the 2014 season for the first time, taking the place of the FIA WTCC Race of Italy.

Moroccan driver Mehdi Bennani has taken the independents' victory twice when he finished ninth in both race one in 2009 and race two in 2012.

Winners

References

 
Morocco
Morocco
Motorsport competitions in Morocco
Recurring sporting events established in 2009
2009 establishments in Morocco
Sports competitions in Marrakesh